Sidi Khalifa or Sidi Khelifa may refer to the following places in the Maghreb (Northern Africa) :

 Sidi Khalifa, Libya
 Sidi Khelifa (Tunisia)